The 2002–03 season was Reading's first season back in the First Division, since their promotion from the Second Division in 2002.

Season review
See also Football League First Division 2002–03

Squad

Left club during season

Transfers

In

Out

Loans in

Loans out

Released

Competitions

Division One

Results summary

Fixtures and results

Playoffs

Semi-finals

Reading lost 3–1 on aggregate

League table

League Cup

FA Cup

First team statistics

Appearances and goals

|-
|colspan="14"|Players who appeared for Reading but left during the season:
  

|}

Top scorers

Disciplinary record

Team kit
Reading's kit for the 2002–03 was manufactured by Kit@, and the main sponsor was Westcoast.

References

Soccerbase

Reading F.C. seasons
Reading